Ryan Gunderson (born September 22, 1984) is an American football coach who is currently the quarterbacks coach at the University of California, Los Angeles. He was previously the quarterbacks coach and passing game coordinator at San Jose State University.

Playing career 
Gunderson played quarterback at Oregon State from 2003 to 2007, spending most of his career as a backup quarterback. The only start of his career was the annual Civil War matchup against Oregon in 2005, where he threw four interceptions and lost a fumble in a 56–14 loss. He was named a team captain his senior year at OSU in 2007.

Coaching career

Oregon State 
After graduating with a degree in construction engineering management in 2007, Gunderson chose to pursue a career in football rather than a job in engineering and joined the coaching staff at Oregon State as a graduate assistant. He lived with Oregon State offensive coordinator Danny Langsdorf and his wife during his time as a graduate assistant, with the Langsdorfs calling him "their first child". He was named the assistant director of player personnel in 2010, a tailor-made position for Gunderson that was created by head coach Mike Riley.

Nebraska 
When Riley departed Oregon State to accept the head coaching position at Nebraska in December 2014, Gunderson joined him as his director of player personnel.

San Jose State 
Gunderson was named the quarterbacks coach at San Jose State in 2017. He added the title of passing game coordinator in 2018.

Gunderson was a nominee for the Broyles Award in 2019, given to the best assistant coach in college football.

UCLA 
Gunderson was named the quarterbacks coach at UCLA on February 19, 2021.

References

External links 
 San Jose State bio
 Oregon State bio

1984 births
Living people
Players of American football from Portland, Oregon
Coaches of American football from Oregon
American football quarterbacks
Oregon State Beavers football players
Oregon State Beavers football coaches
Nebraska Cornhuskers football coaches
San Jose State Spartans football coaches
UCLA Bruins football coaches